West Essex, formally known as the West Division of Essex was a parliamentary constituency in the English county of Essex.  From 1868 to 1885, it returned two Members of Parliament (MPs) to the House of Commons of the Parliament of the United Kingdom, using the bloc vote system of election.

Creation, boundaries and abolition
West Essex was created by the Reform Act 1867 for the 1868 general election as one of three two-member divisions of Essex (East, South and West), replacing the two divisions which had been created by the Reform Act 1832 (Northern and Southern). Initially named as the North West Division, it was renamed the West Division under the Boundaries Act 1868. The seat was created from parts of both South Essex and North Essex.

1868–1885: The Hundreds of Freshwell, Uttlesford, Clavering, Dunmow, Harlow, Waltham, Ongar, and Chelmsford.

The first four of these hundreds had been part of the abolished Northern division, with the remainder transferred from the Southern Division.

Under the Redistribution of Seats Act 1885, the three two-member divisions of Essex were abolished and replaced by eight single-member divisions. West Essex was replaced by the Epping Division and parts of the Saffron Walden and Chelmsford Divisions.

Members of Parliament
The constituency was represented throughout its existence by the same two MPs, both of whom were Conservatives.

Election results 

The only contested election in Western Essex was in 1880, when the former King's Lynn MP Sir Thomas Buxton failed to win a seat for the Liberal Party.

References

Sources 

Parliamentary constituencies in Essex (historic)
Constituencies of the Parliament of the United Kingdom established in 1868
Constituencies of the Parliament of the United Kingdom disestablished in 1885